South Dakota Initiated Measure 26 was a 2020 voter initiative to legalize medical cannabis in the U.S. state of South Dakota. The initiative was certified by the South Dakota Secretary of State for the 2020 ballot on December 19, 2019. The sponsor of the initiative was New Approach South Dakota, a volunteer group headed by Melissa Mentele. The group had unsuccessfully tried to get an initiative on the 2018 ballot. Polling in September 2020 indicated 70% voter support for the initiative.

On November 3, 2020, the initiative passed with 70% approval. With the passage of Constitutional Amendment A on the same ballot, South Dakota would have become the first state in US history to legalize recreational and medical cannabis simultaneously, but Amendment A was struck down as unconstitutional the following February, pending a higher court's ruling.

After the election, South Dakota governor Kristi Noem requested the state legislature delay the implementation of IM 26 from July 2021 until 2022, ostensibly to give the state more time to prepare due to complications stemming from the COVID-19 pandemic. State House members agreed to reduce the proposed delay from July 2022 until January 2022 and subsequently passed Noem's legislation, but disagreements with the Senate over an amendment to the bill legalizing personal possession of cannabis resulted in the collapse of legislative negotiations on medical marijuana. IM 26 is therefore scheduled to go into effect on July 1, 2021, as originally planned.

Results

See also
Cannabis in South Dakota

References

External links
South Dakota Initiated Measure 26, Medical Marijuana Initiative (2020), Ballotpedia

2020 cannabis law reform
Cannabis in South Dakota
Proposed laws of the United States
Cannabis ballot measures in the United States
Measure 26
South Dakota Measure 26
South Dakota ballot measures